Pat Murray (born October 31, 1984) is a former American football guard. He was signed by the Green Bay Packers as an undrafted free agent in 2007. He played college football at Truman State.

Murray has also been a member of the Seattle Seahawks, Denver Broncos, and Cleveland Browns.

College career
At Truman State, Murray earned Honorable Mention All-MIAA in 2004, 2005 Second-team All-MIAA, 2006 First-team All-MIAA. He then went on to play in the (Division I-AA, II, III, and NAIA) 2006 East Coast Bowl in Petersburg Virginia. 
Because of his performance at the East Coast Bowl he was asked to participate in the inaugural (Division I) 2007 Texas vs. The Nation game in El Paso, Texas.

Professional career

Green Bay Packers
After going undrafted in the 2007 NFL Draft, Murray signed with the Green Bay Packers on May 4, 2007. He was waived before the start of the 2007 regular season.

Seattle Seahawks
Murray was signed to the Seattle Seahawks practice squad during the 2008 season.

Denver Broncos
Murray was signed off the Seahawks practice squad by the Denver Broncos on December 9, 2008. He was waived on August 17, 2009.

Cleveland Browns
Murray was signed by the Cleveland Browns on August 20, 2009. Murray was signed to a reserved/future contract January 5, 2010. He was released on September 4, 2011.

References

External links
Cleveland Browns bio
Denver Broncos bio
Seattle Seahawks bio

1984 births
Living people
Players of American football from Iowa
American football offensive guards
Truman Bulldogs football players
Green Bay Packers players
Seattle Seahawks players
Denver Broncos players
Cleveland Browns players
Sportspeople from Fort Dodge, Iowa